Events in the year 1909 in India.

Incumbents
 Emperor of India – Edward VII
 Viceroy of India – Gilbert Elliot-Murray-Kynynmound, 4th Earl of Minto

Events
 National income - 11,094 million
 Adoption of schemes of reform
 Nasik conspiracy

Law
 Morley-Minto reforms
Presidency-Towns Insolvency Act
Anand Marriage Act

Births
1 January – Dattaram Hindlekar, cricketer (died 1949)
3 January – M. K. Thyagaraja Bhagavathar, actor and Carnatic singer (died 1959).
10 February – Pisharoth Rama Pisharoty, physicist and meteorologist (died 2002).
6 April – Alagappa Chettiar, businessman and philanthropist (died 1957).
16 July – Aruna Asaf Ali, independence fighter (died 1996).
19 July – Balamani Amma, poet (died 2004).
9 September – Leela Chitnis, actress (died 2003).
2 October – E. P. Poulose, politician (died 1983).
28 October – Kodavatiganti Kutumbarao, writer (died 1980).
20 December – Vakkom Majeed, freedom fighter and politician (died 2000).

Full date unknown
V. K. Gokak, writer and scholar (died 1992).

References

 
India
Years of the 20th century in India